The name William has been used for two tropical cyclones worldwide, both in the South Pacific Ocean:

 Cyclone William (1983) – late-season tropical cyclone which stayed at sea and became one of the basin's most northeasterly-forming storms.
 Cyclone William (1994) – affected the Cook Islands and French Polynesia, causing notable damage.

South Pacific cyclone set index articles